The quiff is a hairstyle that combines the 1950s pompadour hairstyle, the 1950s flattop, and sometimes a mohawk. It was born as a post-war reaction to the short and strict haircuts for men. The hairstyle was a staple in the British 'Teddy Boy' movement, but became popular again in Europe in the early 1980s and experienced a resurgence in popularity during the 1990s.

Origin
The etymology of the word "quiff" is uncertain, several proposals have been suggested for its origin. It may owe its origin to the French word coiffe, which can mean either a hairstyle or, going further back, the mail that knights wore over their heads and under their helmets.  Another possible candidate for its origin is the Dutch word kuif, meaning "crest". The Dutch name for Tintin, who sports a quiff, is Kuifje, which is the diminutive of the same word.

Styles
The modern-day quiff includes plenty of hair at the front of the top of the head, receding into shorter hair at the back with a trimmed back and sides. The Japanese punch perm, a favorite among yakuza (organized criminals) and bōsōzoku (biker gangs), is similar to the quiff.

See also
 Fauxhawk
 List of hairstyles

References

External links 
 
 

Fashion
1950s fashion
1980s fashion
2010s fashion